Brăhășești is a commune in Galați County, Western Moldavia, Romania with a population of 7,692 people. It is composed of four villages: Brăhășești, Corcioveni, Cosițeni and Toflea.

At the 2011 census, 68.3% of inhabitants were Roma and 31.7% Romanians.

References

Communes in Galați County
Localities in Western Moldavia